Violet (Ljubica) is a 1978 Croatian film directed by Krešo Golik, starring Božidarka Frajt and Ivan Piko Stančić.

External links
 
 Ljubica at hrfilm.hr 

1978 films
1970s Croatian-language films
Films directed by Krešo Golik
Croatian drama films
1978 drama films
Yugoslav drama films